James Edward Saunders was an English footballer who played as a goalkeeper. He played in the Football League for Glossop, Manchester United, Lincoln City and Chelsea, and also appeared for Middlesbrough, Nelson and Watford. He was born in Birmingham.

Notes

References

External links
Profile at StretfordEnd.co.uk
Saunders' Manchester United profile at MUFCinfo.com

Footballers from Birmingham, West Midlands
English footballers
Association football goalkeepers
Glossop North End A.F.C. players
Middlesbrough F.C. players
Manchester United F.C. players
Nelson F.C. players
Lincoln City F.C. players
Chelsea F.C. players
Watford F.C. players
English Football League players
Midland Football League players
Year of birth missing
Year of death missing
Place of death missing